Steven Bognar (born 1963) is an American film director.

He is an Oscar-winning and award-winning documentary  filmmaker, whose films have been screened at SXSW, Sundance, and the Ann Arbor Film Festival. He has also worked as an instructor of media arts, teaching at public schools across his home state of Ohio, as well as at Antioch College. He is a frequent collaborator with Julia Reichert.

Career 
In January 2020, Steven Bognar and Julia Reichert won the Directors Guild of America Award for Documentary for American Factory.

Style 
Bognar has developed a documentary filmmaking style that centralizes the Midwestern region of the United States, with significance placed on incorporating photographic imagery.

Filmography 

 Welcome to Censornati (1990)
 Personal Belongings (1996)
 Waiting for Marty (1999)
 Picture Day (2000)
 Gravel (2006)
 A Lion in the House (2006, with Julia Reichert)
 The Last Truck: Closing of a GM Plant (2009, with Reichert)
 Sparkle (2012, with Reichert)
 Making Morning Star (2015, with Reichert)
 American Factory (2019, with Reichert)
 9to5: The Story of a Movement (2020, with Reichert)
 8:46 (2020, with Reichert)
 Dave Chappelle: Live in Real Life (2021, with Reichert)

References

External links 
 

American documentary film directors
Living people
1963 births
Directors of Best Documentary Feature Academy Award winners
Primetime Emmy Award winners
Sundance Film Festival award winners